Kwon Yeong-jin (권영진) may refer to:
 Kwon Yong-jin, North Korean general
 Kwon Young-jin (politician) (born 1962), South Korean politician
 Kwon Young-jin (born 1991), South Korean footballer